The Ounuora River is a river of the Coromandel Peninsula in the Waikato Region of New Zealand's North Island.

See also
List of rivers of New Zealand

References

Thames-Coromandel District
Rivers of Waikato
Rivers of New Zealand